Fan Island is a  summit located in the Grand Canyon, in Coconino County of northern Arizona, US. It is situated two miles south of Dutton Point, 2.5 miles west-northwest of Dox Castle, and 1.6 miles south-southwest of Masonic Temple. Fan Island was so named because the flat top resembles an unfolded hand fan. According to the Köppen climate classification system, Fan Island is located in a cold semi-arid climate zone, with precipitation runoff draining south to the Colorado River via Hakatai Canyon from the west aspect, and Burro Canyon from the east aspect. This butte is an erosional remnant composed of Redwall Limestone overlaying the Tonto Group.

See also
 Geology of the Grand Canyon area

References

Gallery

External links 

 Weather forecast: National Weather Service
 Fan Island photo by Harvey Butchart
 Fan Island (lower right) seen from Dutton Point: photo

Grand Canyon
Landforms of Coconino County, Arizona
Colorado Plateau
Grand Canyon National Park
Buttes of Arizona
North American 1000 m summits
Grand Canyon, North Rim
Grand Canyon, North Rim (west)